Polystichum munitum, the western swordfern, is an evergreen perennial fern native to western North America, where it is one of the most abundant ferns in forested areas. It occurs along the Pacific coast from southeastern Alaska to southern California, and also inland east to southeastern British Columbia, northern Idaho and western Montana, with disjunctive populations in northern British Columbia, Canada; the Black Hills in South Dakota, United States;  and Guadalupe Island off of Baja California, Mexico. Western swordfern is known to have locally naturalized in parts of Great Britain and Ireland.

Description
They are single-pinnate, with the pinnae alternating on the stalk. Individual fronds live for 1.5 to 2.5 years and remain attached to the rhizome after withering. The round sori occupy two rows on either side of the midrib of each pinna and are covered by a centrally-attached, umbrella-like indusium with fringed edges. They produce light yellow spores. In deep shade, fronds spread nearly horizontally but with increasing sun exposure grow more upright.

Habitat and cultivation

The preferred habitat of this fern is the understory of moist coniferous woodlands at low elevations. It grows best in well-drained acidic soil of rich humus and small stones. It is very resilient and survives occasional droughts, but flourishes only with consistent moisture and it prefers cool weather.

In cultivation, it also responds well to regular, light fertilization. While this fern is a favored horticultural subject in western North America, it has proved difficult or impossible to cultivate satisfactorily in the eastern part of the continent.

In the United Kingdom Polystichum munitum has gained the Royal Horticultural Society's Award of Garden Merit.

Phylogeny
According to a molecular phylogeny of Polystichum ferns based on plastid DNA sequences, P. munitum is most closely related to other North American Polystichum species, including the western species Polystichum lemmonii, Polystichum scopulinum, and Polystichum dudleyi, and the eastern species Polystichum acrostichoides.

Utility
The Coast Salish people of B.C. and Washington state use this plant as a pain reliever. When applied directly to the area where pain and inflammation occur, according to Della Rice Sylvester, an elder and medicine woman of the Cowichan tribe, the sword fern "takes the pain away!". This traditional use has spread among the hiking communities and youth scouting organizations of the region, where it is a common piece of hiker's lore that a rash from a stinging nettle can be counteracted by rubbing the spores on the underside of sword fern on the area.

In spring, when other food is unavailable, Quileute, Makah, Klallam, Squamish, Sechelt, Haida, and other Native American/First Nations peoples roasted, peeled, and ate the rhizomes. The fronds were used to line fire pits and food drying racks and as filling for mattresses. The plant is also cultivated for its ornamental foliage, which florists include in vases.

References

External links

 USDA Plants Profile: Polystichum munitum
 Jepson eFlora Treatment of Polystichum munitum
 Calflora Database: Polystichum munitum (western sword fern)
 Flora of North America: Polystichum munitum
 USFS Profile: Species: Polystichum munitum

munitum
Ferns of California
Flora of the West Coast of the United States
Flora of the Northwestern United States
Flora of Alaska
Flora of Baja California
Flora of Mexican Pacific Islands
Flora of California
Flora of British Columbia
Flora of Montana
Flora of Oregon
Flora of South Dakota
Flora of the Cascade Range
Flora of the Great Basin
Flora of the Klamath Mountains
Flora of the Sierra Nevada (United States)
Natural history of the California chaparral and woodlands
Natural history of the California Coast Ranges
Natural history of the Channel Islands of California
Natural history of the San Francisco Bay Area
Taxa named by Carl Borivoj Presl
Garden plants of North America
Flora without expected TNC conservation status